Basie One More Time (subtitled Music from the Pen of Quincy Jones) is an album by pianist and bandleader Count Basie performing the compositions and arrangements of Quincy Jones recorded in late 1958 and early 1959 and originally released on the Roulette label.

Reception

AllMusic's review states, "Jones's charts helped expand the Basie sound without altering it. An excellent CD".

Track listing
All compositions by Quincy Jones
 "For Lena and Lennie"  - 3:57
 "Rat Race" - 2:57
 "Quince" - 3:55
 "Meet B B" - 3:35
 "The Big Walk" - 2:55
 "A Square at the Roundtable" - 2:16
 "I Needs to Be Bee'd With" - 3:29
 "Jessica's Day" - 4:24
 "The Midnite Sun Never Sets" - 3:34
 "Muttnik" - 5:25
Recorded in New York City on December 19, 1958 (tracks 1, 2, 4, 5 & 9) and Chicago on January 23 & 24, 1959 (tracks 3, 6, 7, 8 & 10)

Personnel 
Count Basie - piano
Wendell Culley, Thad Jones, Joe Newman, Snooky Young - trumpet
Henry Coker, Al Grey, Benny Powell - trombone
Marshal Royal - alto saxophone, clarinet
Frank Wess - alto saxophone, tenor saxophone, flute
Frank Foster, Billy Mitchell - tenor saxophone
Charlie Fowlkes - baritone saxophone
Freddie Green - guitar
Eddie Jones - bass
Sonny Payne - drums
Quincy Jones - arranger

References 

1959 albums
Count Basie Orchestra albums
Roulette Records albums
Albums arranged by Quincy Jones
Albums produced by Teddy Reig